Manuiyeh may refer to:
 Manuiyeh, Gughar (منوئيه - Mānū’īyeh)